Ayeshaa Rajab Ali is a Pakistani politician who has been a member of the National Assembly of Pakistan since August 2018.

Political career

She was elected to the National Assembly of Pakistan as a candidate of Pakistan Muslim League (N) (PML-N) on a reserved seat for women from Punjab in 2018 Pakistani general election. She is the wife of late Rajab Ali Khan Baloch (24 September 1969 – 13 May 2018), who was also a Pakistani politician.

References

Living people
Pakistan Muslim League (N) MNAs
Pakistani MNAs 2018–2023
Women members of the National Assembly of Pakistan
Year of birth missing (living people)
21st-century Pakistani women politicians